Libyan Cement Company Inc. is one of the biggest cement manufacturers in Libya. With six product lines at the locations Benghazi, Hawari and Al-Fataiah it covers more than one third of the Libyan cement demand. In 2008 the Asamer Group together with the Libyan government holding company ESDF (Economic and Social Development Fund) took over 90% of the Libyan Cement Company (LCC).

Background
The Libyan Cement Company started production in 1972 with one factory. The production capacity for ordinary Portland cement was 200,000 t/yr. In 1974, a new production line was added with a capacity of 400,000 t/yr. A third production line was built in 1977 with a 400,000 ton capacity, which brought production to 1 million t/yr of ordinary Portland cement. However, the first factory stopped production due to maintenance problems. As of 2007, the Benghazi plant produces 800,000 t/yr. The Hawari plant, which was established in 1964 to produce 1,000,000 t/yr. In 1987, adjustments were made to the Hawari plant production lines to produce sulphate-resistant cement. The El-Fatayah factory was established in 1982 with two production lines having a 1,000,000 t/yr capacity of ordinary Portland cement. This factory is located 350 km east of Benghazi, near Derna.  LCC also has a factory that produces the cement packaging, which was established in 1975; as it stands today, the factory produces 200,000 bags per day. In April 2015, Libya Holdings Group announced that it had acquired a majority stake in Libya Cement Company from Austria's QuadraCir Group as part of a long-term strategic plan aimed at rebuilding Libya's infrastructure

Domestic consumption and limitations
All of LCC’s cement production is domestically consumed, with market demand exceeding LCC’s capacity. Demand for cement is very high; for building and construction,  which consumed an estimated 8,000,000 tonnes of the sulphate-resistant cement. Upon the entrance of Asamer Holding 100MEUR modernization and investment  projects were completed increasing the production efficiency, environmental protection measures and labor safety standards.

References

1972 establishments in Libya
Manufacturing companies established in 1972
Cement companies of Libya
Libyan brands